Horsfieldia macrothyrsa is a species of plant in the family Myristicaceae. It is a tree endemic to Sumatra.

References

macrothyrsa
Endemic flora of Sumatra
Trees of Sumatra
Near threatened flora of Asia
Taxonomy articles created by Polbot